Sandy Jardine Davidson (born 28 May 1972) is a Scottish boy who disappeared on 23 April 1976, when he was three years old, while he was playing in the back garden of his house in the Bourtreehill housing estate in Irvine, Ayrshire.

Background
On 23 April 1976, Sandy Davidson was in his garden with his little sister Donna playing with their dog. They were being looked after by their grandparents, who had gone inside the house at the time. The gate flew open, and their dog ran out. Sandy ran out, trying to catch him. His sister Donna says that all she can remember was Sandy motioning for her to go too, but she refused and went into the house to tell their grandparents.

Work ground to a halt on the new building estate nearby to search for Sandy, but nobody has seen him since.

The most believed scenario is that there was a man delivering leaflets around the time of Sandy's disappearance and that he could have opened the gate and taken Sandy. Sandy's mother, Margaret, and father Phillip believe that it was a lonely man wanting a son.

Another theory is that he ran down to the river five minutes away and followed the dog in, and subsequently drowned.

Subsequent events
The case was featured in an episode of the television series Missing Children: Lorraine Kelly Investigates in 2009, but nobody phoned in with information.

A DNA test was carried out in November 2013 on someone who was born around the same time as Sandy and who lived 20 miles away, but he turned out not to be the missing toddler.

In September 2014, the Broomlands Primary School, which was constructed around the time of Sandy's disappearance, was demolished. The police and council refused to excavate the land to search for Sandy.

In February 2015, a surprise new witness emerged who had made contact via the social networking website Facebook, claiming to have been abducted and tortured by a teenage girl at around the same time that Sandy disappeared.

See also
List of people who disappeared

References

1970s missing person cases
1972 births
1976 crimes in the United Kingdom
1976 in Scotland
Missing person cases in Scotland
Missing Scottish children
People from Irvine, North Ayrshire
Possibly living people